Mia-Maria Kjærsgaard-Andersen (born 19 January 1989) is a Danish retired football goalkeeper who played for IK Skovbakken, SønderjyskE Fodbold and the Danish national team.

International career
Kjærsgaard-Andersen was also part of the Danish team at the 2009 European Championships.

References

1989 births
Living people
VSK Aarhus (women) players
Danish women's footballers
Denmark women's international footballers
Women's association football goalkeepers